is a Japanese seventy-episode anime television series created by Toei Animation and broadcast from 1997 to 1999. It was based on the novel series by Reizo Fukunaga, and was adapted into a manga by Michiru Kataoka and serialized in Nakayoshi from August 1997 to August 1998. It has been dubbed into French, Italian, Russian, Korean and Chinese.

Plot

The civilians of the Crayon Kingdom have always viewed their Princess Silver as a twelve-year-old girl with a beautiful smile. However, unknown to them, the princess has 12 bad habits. This has created much distress to the Chameleon Prime Minister and the Crayon ministers for it would be embarrassing if this gets out.

One day, a party is held to celebrate Silver's twelfth birthday. The princess is so busy trying to find a suitable dance-partner that she forgets to hide her bad habits. The boy she thinks suitable to dance with refuses to dance and, after a short quarrel, he changes Silver's parents, the King and Queen, into stone.

Along with a pig named Stonston and a chicken named Araessa, Silver learns that only the Grim Reaper is capable of casting a spell like that, and she assumes that the boy was actually him in disguise. So begins their quest to find the boy Reaper. They do not realize, that the boy and the Grim Reaper are two different people entirely. The Grim Reaper is trying to kill Silver, whose ancestor trapped him in a mirror for several thousand years. The boy is trying to save her, and her parents, whom he transformed into stone to prevent them from being killed.

They finally realize this, when the boy saves them from the Grim Reaper. He says he is the Prince Cloud, and that he will help them destroy the Grim Reaper and Silver develops a crush on him. However, he constantly annoys her. They eventually find out that in order to destroy the Grim Reaper, Princess Silver must get rid of her 12 bad habits.

They eventually succeed, by reassembling the broken pieces of a mirror and deciphering the hidden code. They finally realize that they have to "Tickle the Grim Reaper under the Left Arm" to destroy him and send him back into the mirror. They then cut off a lock of his hair and sprinkle it over The King and Queen, which brings them back to life.

However, due to that it isn't over, Silver's maid, Punya, a cat, liberates two mischievous angels. Princess Silver and her friends set off on yet another journey to bring them back. Prince Cloud does reappear to help them, but not often. Once this has been done, Silver, Cloud, Punya, Araessa and Stonston set off on a journey around the kingdom.

Episodes

Reception

References

External links
Yume Crayon no Oukoku at Toei Animation 
Yume Crayon no Oukoku DVD-BOX at Frontier Works 

1997 anime television series debuts
1998 manga
Toei Animation television
Asahi Broadcasting Corporation original programming
TV Asahi original programming
Shōjo manga
Magical girl anime and manga